Branko Miljuš (born 17 August 1960) is a Croatian retired footballer.

Club career
During his club career he played in 357 games (217 competitive matches) for Hajduk Split.

In his late career, Miljuš left Yugoslavia few years before the independence of Croatia, at the time tension of Serbs and Croats was rising. He then played in Spain for Real Valladolid and in Portugal for Vitória Setúbal.

International career
Miljuš made his debut for Yugoslavia in a June 1984 friendly match away against Portugal and earned a total of 14 caps, scoring no goals. He  participated in the UEFA Euro 1984. He won a bronze medal playing for Yugoslavia in the 1984 Summer Olympics in Los Angeles.

His final international was an April 1988 friendly away against the Republic of Ireland.

References

External links
 
 
 

1960 births
Living people
Sportspeople from Knin
Association football defenders
Yugoslav footballers
Yugoslavia international footballers
UEFA Euro 1984 players
Olympic footballers of Yugoslavia
Footballers at the 1984 Summer Olympics
Olympic bronze medalists for Yugoslavia
Olympic medalists in football
Medalists at the 1984 Summer Olympics
HNK Hajduk Split players
Real Valladolid players
Vitória F.C. players
Yugoslav First League players
La Liga players
Primeira Liga players
Yugoslav expatriate footballers
Expatriate footballers in Spain
Yugoslav expatriate sportspeople in Spain
Expatriate footballers in Portugal

Croatian expatriate sportspeople in Portugal